The blue swallow (Hirundo atrocaerulea) is a small bird within the swallow family which is in the order Passeriformes.  Swallows are somewhat similar in habits and appearance to other aerial insectivores, such as the martins (also a passerine) and the swifts (order Apodiformes). It breeds in the Afromontane (from South Africa to Tanzania), wintering north of Lake Victoria.

This bird breeds in montane grassland, preferring high rainfall, undulating areas. In winter it prefers open grassland, with bushes and trees. The nest is usually attached to the roof or side of a hole in the ground.

Description
This species is a small swallow at 	. The adult birds have a highly lustrous dark metallic steel-blue appearance with long tail streamers, which are particularly noticeable in males. White feathers are visible on the rump and flanks when the birds are preening and especially during courtship. In poor light, blue swallows appear almost black and therefore can be mistaken for black saw-wing swallows (Psalidoprocne spp.) which occur throughout its breeding range. Young blue swallows start life a brownish-grey, acquiring their blue colour as they mature. This species has a musical "bee-bee-bee-bee" call when in flight.

Biology
Blue swallows feed on small, soft-bodied flies and other arthropods, catching them on the wing.

The blue swallow arrives on the breeding range at the end of September and constructs cup-shaped nests from mud and grass on the inside of sinkhole cavities, aardvark burrows and old mine shafts. The breeding system of the blue swallow is not well understood although co-operative breeding has been widely recorded in this species. The nests are lined with fine grass, animal hair and white feathers. Normally, three white eggs are laid. They are incubated by the female for 14 days, and the chicks are fed for approximately 22 days until they fledge. Once fledged, the young spend the next couple of days around the nest site before disappearing. Most blue swallows will rear a second brood before returning to the over-wintering grounds in April.

Threats
This species is classified as Vulnerable due to destruction of its habitat at both its breeding and wintering sites. The current population is estimated at 1,500-4,000 and decreasing.

References

External links
 Blue Swallow - Species text in The Atlas of Southern African Birds.
 Blue Swallow Factsheet, Endangered Wildlife Trust
 Boue Swallow Working Group, Travelers Conservation Trust

blue swallow
Birds of Sub-Saharan Africa
blue swallow